Hiram Casey Young (December 14, 1828 – August 17, 1899) was an American lawyer and politician and a member of the United States House of Representatives for the 10th congressional district of Tennessee.

Biography
Young was born in Tuscaloosa, Alabama in Tuscaloosa County. He moved with his parents to a farm near Byhalia, Mississippi in Marshall County in 1838. He attended the local schools, was tutored by his father, and also  the Cavalry.

Career
Elected as a Democrat to the Forty-fourth, Forty-fifth, and Forty-sixth Congresses, Young served from March 4, 1875 to March 3, 1881,  but was an unsuccessful candidate for re-election in 1880. However he was elected to the Forty-eighth, serving in that period from March 4, 1883 to March 3, 1885. During this Forty-eighth Congress, he was the chairman of the United States House Committee on Expenditures in the Department of the Interior. He was not a candidate for renomination, but resumed the practice of law.

Death
Young died in Memphis, Tennessee on August 17, 1899, aged 70.  He is interred at Elmwood Cemetery.

References

External links

1828 births
1899 deaths
Politicians from Tuscaloosa, Alabama
Democratic Party members of the United States House of Representatives from Tennessee
19th-century American politicians
People from Byhalia, Mississippi